Fudbalski klub Berane (Cyrillic: Фудбалски клуб Беране) is a Montenegrin football club based in Berane. Established at 1920, the club plays in the Second League of Montenegro.

History 
FK Berane was founded in 1920, as one of the first football clubs in Northern Montenegro and Sandžak region.

In the period before World War II, they were the most successful football team from the north. During the 1920s, as other neighbouring clubs mostly played friendlies, FK Berane participated in official competitions of Montenegro. Greatest season of that time was in 1928, when Berane played in the finals of Montenegrin Football Championship. Their opponent in the game for the trophy was FK Lovćen, who won with result 3–0. That was the best result of FK Berane before World War II.

Yugoslav era
After the war, city of Berane was renamed – a new name was Ivangrad. Due to that fact, a new name of football club was Ika Ivangrad. First significant success after World War II, the team made on season 1948–59, with their first-ever performance in Montenegrin Republic League. At 1949, the club was renamed again, so they started to play under the name Radnički Ivangrad. Biggest success in Montenegrin Republic League came in 1951 – Radnički Ivangrad won the title after the hard struggle with FK Sutjeska, but failed to promote to the Second League. Most significant success in the decade came in 1955, when the team gained promotion to the Yugoslav Second League, where they spent only a single season.

In the beginning of the sixties, the club was presented as FK Ivangrad, but they didn't made any significant result until the start of the 1980s. Success came at season 1982–83, when Ivangrad won the title in the Montenegrin Republic League. Their home game against FK Zeta, who was their biggest rival during the season, was attended by 10,000 spectators, which was the all-time record of the Montenegrin Republic League.

Ivangrad finished 11th in the 1983–84 Yugoslav Second League. During the same season, for the first time in the history, the club won the Montenegrin Republic Cup. So, they played in the 1984–85 Yugoslav Cup, but were eliminated in the first stage against NK Osijek (1–3).

After five consecutive seasons in Yugoslav Second League, FK Ivangrad was relegated on season 1987–88. During the breakup of SFR Yugoslavia, the team was a member of third-tied competitions.
Following the change of city name, from 1996, club is playing under the name FK Berane. On season 1996–97, they won the first place in the Montenegrin Republic League, which gave them opportunity to play in the 1997–98 Yugoslav Second League. FK Berane made a few significant results at that time, as sixth place in season 1997–98, but they were relegated after the 2000–2001 season.

Following Montenegrin independence in 2006, as a winner of the last edition of Montenegrin Republic League, FK Berane became a member of inaugural season of the Montenegrin First League. With poor performance, they finished as a last-placed team in the 2006–07 season. The best result in the Montenegrin Cup came at edition 2007–08, when they played against FK Budućnost, but didn't succeed to reach the final game (0–0, 0–4).

By now, FK Berane played four seasons in Prva CFL, but they always finished with relegations.

Evolution of name
During the history, FK Berane participated under three different names. Most of the period, they played under the name of the city (Berane/Ivangrad).

First League Record

For the first time, FK Berane played in Montenegrin First League on season 2006–07. Below is a list of FK Berane scores in First League by every single season.

Honours and achievements
Montenegrin Championship (1922–1940) – 0
runners-up (1): Autumn 1928
Montenegrin Second League – 1
winners (1): 2008–09
runners-up (2): 2010–11, 2013–14
 Montenegrin Republic League – 4
winners (4): 1951, 1982–83, 1996–97, 2005–06
 Montenegrin Republic Cup – 1
winners (1): 1983–84

Players

Current squad

Notable players
For the list of former and current players with Wikipedia article, please see :Category:FK Berane players.

Historical list of coaches

 Slobodan Đukić (Jul 2006 - Apr 2007)
 Vojo Vujović (22 Apr 2007 – )
 Dragan Lacmanović (Jun 2008 - Mar 2010)
 Predrag Pejović (30 Mar 2010 – Jun 2010)
 Slobodan Đukić (Jul 2010 - Jun 2012)
 Slaviša Bozičić (Jun 2013 – Nov 2013)
 Novo Cimbaljević (15 Nov 2013 – Jan 2014)
 Nebojša Jovović (25 Jan 2014 – Jun 2014)
 Ratko Stevović (Jul 2014 – Oct 2014)
 Rade Vešović (14 Oct 2014 – Aug 2015)
 Slobodan Đukić (Nov 2018 - Jul 2020)
 Dušan Vlaisavljević (Sep 2020 – )

Stadium

FK Berane plays their home games on Berane City Stadium. It's the largest stadium in Northern Montenegro, with capacity of 6,500 seats. Last renovation was completed in 2018, when the stadium got the modern stand with seats, roofs, dressing rooms and offices under UEFA standards.

See also
Berane City Stadium
Berane
Montenegrin First League
Montenegrin Second League
Montenegrin clubs in Yugoslav football competitions (1946–2006)

External links
FK Berane profile on Montenegrin FA official website

References

Football clubs in Montenegro
Association football clubs established in 1920
Football clubs in Yugoslavia
1920 establishments in Montenegro
Berane